Boychinovtsi Municipality is a municipality (obshtina) in Montana Province, Northwestern Bulgaria, located in the transition between the Danubian Plain and the area of the so-called Fore-Balkan. It is named after its administrative centre – the town of Boychinovtsi.

Ogosta river, a right tributary of the Danube, flows through the area from southwest to northeast.

Settlements 

Boychinovtsi Municipality includes the following 13 places (towns are shown in bold):

Demography 
The following table shows the change of the population during the last four decades. Since 1992 Boychinovtsi Municipality has comprised the former municipality of Lehchevo and the numbers in the table reflect this unification.

Religion 
According to the latest Bulgarian census of 2011, the religious composition, among those who answered the optional question on religious identification, was the following:

See also
Provinces of Bulgaria
Municipalities of Bulgaria
List of cities and towns in Bulgaria

References

External links
 Official website 

Municipalities in Montana Province